LaTonya Johnson (born 17 August 1975) is a former professional basketball player who played in the WNBA for seven seasons. She also played overseas in Israel and Bulgaria.

College
Johnson played at Memphis from 1994 to 1998, where she was a four-year letterwinner. She left Memphis as its third all-time leading scorer (2,232), sixth all-time in rebounds (686), and all-time leader in three-point field goals made (207). During the four years, the team compiled an 86–34 record.

Honors and awards

College
Conference USA Tournament MVP as a senior (1998)
Conference USA First Team member (1996 and 1998) 
Second team honoree (1997)
3x C-USA Player of the Week 
Great Midwest Conference Newcomer of the Year (1995)
First team all-Great Midwest Conference (as a freshman) 
Basketball Times All-American Honorable Mention (1996 and 1998) 
USA Today Freshman of Influence (1994–95), one of just two Lady Tigers to ever earn that honor.

References

1975 births
Living people
American women's basketball players
Basketball players from Tennessee
Forwards (basketball)
Houston Comets players
Memphis Tigers women's basketball players
People from Winchester, Tennessee
San Antonio Stars players
Utah Starzz draft picks
Utah Starzz players